Ammapettai is a panchayat town in Anthiyur taluk of  Erode district  in the state of Tamil Nadu, India

Geography 
It has an average elevation of 1 metre (3 feet).

Demographics 
 India census, Ammapettai had a population of 8991. Males constitute 51% of the population and females 49%. Ammapettai has an average literacy rate of 54%, lower than the national average of 59.5%; with 60% of the males and 40% of females literate. 10% of the population is under 6 years of age.
Ammapettai lies on the banks of the Kaveri river, and the arterial road connecting Erode and Mettur passes through the heart of the village.

References 

Cities and towns in Erode district